Professor Robert Kerford Morton FAA (7 August 1920 – 27 September 1963) was an Australian biochemist. He was Associate Professor of Biochemistry at the University of Melbourne from 1952 to 1958, and Professor of Agricultural Chemistry at the University of Adelaide's Waite Agricultural Research Institute from 1959 to 1962. In 1963 he became Professor of Biochemistry at Adelaide, but soon after his 43rd birthday died as the result of an accident in his laborary.

Career
Morton was born on 7 August 1920 in Cootamundra, New South Wales. His family settled in Sydney where Morton attended Sydney Boys High School. From 1936 to 1938 he attended Hawkesbury Agricultural College where he eearned a Diploma in Dairy Technology before attending the University of Sydney. His studies were interrupted by the war where he served as a Lieutenant in Royal Australian Navy and Royal Navy. After the war he returned to Sydney where he graduated with First Class Honours in 1948. Awarded the first Gowrie Travelling Scholarshp, he married Jessie Noelle Telfer and they proceeded to the University of Cambridge where in 1952 he was awarded a Ph.D.

In 1952 he returned to a Senior Lecturer position at the University of Melbourne where he was rapidly promoted to reader and associate professor. In 1957 he was elected a Fellow of the Australian Academy of Science. In 1959 he took the position of Professor of Agricultural Chemistry at the University of Adelaide's Waite Agricultural Research Institute. In 1962 he took a sabbatical, and in 1963 he returned to Adelaide to take up the chair of Biochemistry.

Morton died in Adelaide on 27 September 1963, early in his 44th year, as the result of an accident in his laboratory.

References

Further reading
'Obituaries: Trevett William Dalwood, Robert Kerford Morton and George Albert Elliott', Journal and Proceedings of the Royal Australian Chemical Institute, vol. 30, no. 11, 1963, pp. 450–452. 
'Obituary: Robert Kerford Morton', Journal of the Australian Institute of Agricultural Science, vol. 30, no. 1, 1964, pp. 69–70. 
Melville, J., 'Obituary: Robert Kerford Morton', Australian Journal of Science, vol. 26, no. 9, 1964, pp. 285–286.

1920 births
1963 deaths
Australian biochemists
Fellows of the Australian Academy of Science
University of Sydney alumni
Australian expatriates in the United Kingdom
Alumni of the University of Cambridge